Kennebec County is a county located in the South-central portion of the U.S. state of Maine. At the 2020 census, the population was 123,642. Its county seat is Augusta, the state capital. The county was established on February 20, 1799, from portions of Cumberland and Lincoln Counties. The name Kennebec comes from the Eastern Abenaki /kínipekʷ/, meaning "large body of still water, large bay."

Kennebec County comprises the Augusta–Waterville, ME Micropolitan Statistical Area.

In 2010, the center of population of Maine was in Kennebec County, in the city of Augusta.

Geography

Adjacent counties
Somerset County – north
Waldo County – east
Sagadahoc County – south
Lincoln County – south
Androscoggin County – southwest
Franklin County – northwest

Demographics

2000 census
As of the census of 2000, there were 117,114 people, 47,683 households, and 31,327 families living in the county. The population density was 135 people per square mile (52/km2). There were 56,364 housing units at an average density of 65 per square mile (25/km2). The racial makeup of the county was 97.45% White, 0.34% Black or African American, 0.40% Native American, 0.59% Asian, 0.02% Pacific Islander, 0.18% from other races, and 1.02% from two or more races. 0.73% of the population were Hispanic or Latino of any race. 20.6% were of English, 17.4% French, 13.4% French Canadian, 10.9% United States or American and 9.9% Irish ancestry. 92.5% spoke only English at home, while 5.48% spoke French.

There were 47,683 households, out of which 31.20% had children under the age of 18 living with them, 51.60% were married couples living together, 10.00% had a female householder with no husband present, and 34.30% were non-families. 27.60% of all households were made up of individuals, and 10.60% had someone living alone who was 65 years of age or older. The average household size was 2.38 and the average family size was 2.89.

In the county, the population was spread out, with 23.80% under the age of 18, 8.50% from 18 to 24, 28.60% from 25 to 44, 24.90% from 45 to 64, and 14.20% who were 65 years of age or older. The median age was 39 years. For every 100 females there were 94.00 males. For every 100 females age 18 and over, there were 90.80 males.

The median income for a household in the county was $36,498, and the median income for a family was $43,814. Males had a median income of $32,279 versus $24,032 for females. The per capita income for the county was $18,520. About 8.50% of families and 11.10% of the population were below the poverty line, including 13.20% of those under age 18 and 10.20% of those age 65 or over.

2010 census
As of the 2010 United States Census, there were 122,151 people, 51,128 households, and 32,368 families living in the county. The racial makeup of the county was % from other races, and % from two or more races. Those of Hispanic or Latino origin made up % of the population. In terms of ancestry, 24.2% were English, 17.0% were Irish, 8.3% were German, 7.7% were French Canadian, 5.7% were American, and 5.4% were Scottish.

Of the households, % had children under the age of 18 living with them, % were married couples living together, % had a female householder with no husband present, % were non-families, and % of all households were made up of individuals. The median age was  years.

The median income for a household in the county was $45,973 and the median income for a family was $56,853. Males had a median income of $42,176 versus $32,471 for females. The per capita income for the county was $24,656. About 7.8% of families and 12.5% of the population were below the poverty line, including 16.9% of those under age 18 and 9.6% of those age 65 or over.

Micropolitan statistical area

The United States Office of Management and Budget has designated Kennebec County as the Augusta–Waterville, ME Micropolitan Statistical Area (µSA). As of the 2010 U.S. Census the micropolitan area ranked the most populous in the State of Maine and also the only micropolitan area within the state. The area also ranks 13th most populous in the United States with a population of 122,151.

Economy
Kennebec County's economy has traditionally been industrial. A large amount of paper and textiles were produced, and mills sprung up along the Kennebec river.  The median household income is $36,498. The unemployment rate is 4.2% (lower than it has been in a year).

Education
There are three colleges: Colby College and Thomas College (both in Waterville), and the University of Maine at Augusta. There are 19 school districts (however, 4 are consolidated ones). In China Maine, there is no public high school, but a private school (Erskine Academy) exists, and the town pays for students tuition if they choose to attend. Students from Vassalboro can pick from one of four school districts (Cony in Augusta, Erskine, Winslow, or Waterville). However, many towns have local public high schools.

K-12 school districts include:

 Augusta School District
 Fayette School District
 Vassalboro School District
 Waterville School District
 Winslow School District
 Winthrop School District
 Regional School Unit 02
 Regional School Unit 04
 Regional School Unit 18
 Regional School Unit 12
 Regional School Unit 38
 School Administrative District 09
 School Administrative District 11
 School Administrative District 49
 Kennebec Unorganized Territory

Politics

Kennebec County has consistently voted for Democrats in recent elections, until 2016 when it voted for Donald Trump, the first time since 1988. While the more rural areas support the Republican Party, the urban areas are strongly Democratic. Kennebec County is the only county in Maine that is split between Maine's two congressional districts. The larger, southern portion of the county is in the 1st Congressional District of Maine, while the northern, smaller portion is in the 2nd Congressional District of Maine.

Voter registration

|}

Communities

Cities
Augusta (county seat)
Gardiner
Hallowell
Waterville

Towns

Albion
Belgrade
Benton
Chelsea
China
Clinton
Farmingdale
Fayette
Litchfield
Manchester
Monmouth
Mount Vernon
Oakland
Pittston
Randolph
Readfield
Rome
Sidney
Vassalboro
Vienna
Wayne
West Gardiner
Windsor
Winslow
Winthrop

Unorganized territory
Unity

Census-designated places
Clinton
Farmingdale
Oakland
Winthrop

Other unincorporated villages
China Village
East Vassalboro
East Winthrop
Libby Hill
North Monmouth
North Vassalboro
South China

See also

National Register of Historic Places listings in Kennebec County, Maine

Footnotes

Further reading
 Samuel Lane Boardman, History of the Agriculture of Kennebec County, Maine. New York: Blake, 1892.
 Raymond Stevens Finley, The History of Secondary Education in Kennebec County in Maine. Orono, ME: University of Maine at Orono Press, 1941.
 Rufus Matthew Jones, The Society of Friends in Kennebec County, Maine. New York: H.W. Blake and Co., 1892.
 Henry D. Kingsbury and Simeon L. Deyo (eds.), Illustrated history of Kennebec County, Maine: 1625-1799-1892. New York: H.W. Blake and Co., 1892.
 Cynthia MacAlman McCausland, Index to Kingsbury and Deyo's illustrated history of Kennebec County, Maine. Camden, ME: Picton Press, 1996.
 George W. Walton, History of the Town of Wayne, Kennebec County, Maine, From Its Settlement to 1898. Augusta, ME: Maine Farmer Publishing Co., 1898.
 Edwin Carey Whittemore, The Centennial History of Waterville, Kennebec County, Maine, Including the Oration, the Historical Address and the Poem Presented at the Celebration of the Centennial Anniversary of the Incorporation of the Town, June 23d, 1902. Waterville, ME: Executive Committee of the Centennial Celebration, 1902.

External links
 Official Site of Kennebec County, Maine

 
Maine counties
Maine placenames of Native American origin
1799 establishments in Massachusetts
Populated places established in 1799